August Schotte (20 June 1883 – 4 March 1968) was a Dutch racewalker. He competed in the men's 3000 metres walk at the 1920 Summer Olympics.

References

1883 births
1968 deaths
Athletes (track and field) at the 1920 Summer Olympics
Dutch male racewalkers
Olympic athletes of the Netherlands
Place of birth missing